Dalbergia glomerata is a species of legume in the family Fabaceae.
It is found only in Mexico.

References

Further reading
 
 
 

glomerata
Flora of Mexico
Vulnerable plants
Taxonomy articles created by Polbot